Melatonin is a dietary supplement and medication as well as naturally occurring hormone. As a hormone, melatonin is released by the pineal gland and is involved in sleep–wake cycles. As a supplement, it is often used for the short-term treatment of insomnia, such as from jet lag or shift work, and is typically taken orally. Evidence of its benefit for this use, however, is not strong. A 2017 review found that sleep onset occurred six minutes faster with use, but found no change in total time asleep. A prolonged-release form of melatonin is also approved for use as a medication in Europe for the treatment of insomnia in certain people.

Side effects from melatonin supplements are minimal at low doses for short durations (in the studies reported about equally for both melatonin and placebo). Side effects of melatonin are rare but may occur in 1 to 10 patients in 1,000. They may include somnolence (sleepiness), headaches, nausea, diarrhea, abnormal dreams, irritability, nervousness, restlessness, insomnia, anxiety, migraine, lethargy, psychomotor hyperactivity, dizziness, hypertension, abdominal pain, heartburn, mouth ulcers, dry mouth, hyperbilirubinaemia, dermatitis, night sweats, pruritus, rash, dry skin, pain in the extremities, symptoms of menopause, chest pain, glycosuria (sugar in the urine), proteinuria (protein in the urine), abnormal liver function tests, increased weight, tiredness, mood swings, aggression and feeling hungover. Its use is not recommended during pregnancy or breastfeeding or for those with liver disease.

Melatonin acts as an agonist of the melatonin MT1 and MT2 receptors, the biological targets of endogenous melatonin. It is thought to activate these receptors in the suprachiasmatic nucleus of the hypothalamus in the brain to regulate the circadian clock and sleep–wake cycles. Immediate-release melatonin has a short elimination half-life of about 20 to 50minutes. Prolonged-release melatonin used as a medication has a half-life of 3.5 to 4hours.

Melatonin was discovered in 1958. It is sold over the counter in Canada and the United States; in the United Kingdom, it is a prescription-only medication. In Australia and the European Union, it is indicated for difficulty sleeping in people over the age of 54. In the European Union, it is indicated for the treatment of insomnia in children and adolescents. The US Food and Drug Administration (FDA) treats melatonin as a dietary supplement and as such has not approved it for any medical uses. It was approved for medical use in the European Union in 2007. Besides melatonin, certain synthetic melatonin receptor agonists like ramelteon, tasimelteon, and agomelatine are also used in medicine. In 2020, it was the 298th most commonly prescribed medication in the United States, with more than 1million prescriptions.

Medical uses

Insomnia
In the European Union, prolonged-release melatonin (Circadin) is indicated for the treatment of insomnia in children and adolescents age 2 to 18 with autism spectrum disorder (ASD) and Smith–Magenis syndrome, in whom sleep hygiene measures have been insufficient. Some studies have shown melatonin to reduce the time until onset of sleep and increase sleep duration in children with neurodevelopmental disorders. It is also indicated for the short-term treatment of primary insomnia characterized by poor quality of sleep in people who are aged 55 or over. It is deemed to be a first-line agent for short-term treatment of insomnia in people 55 years old or older.

Positions on the benefits of melatonin for insomnia are mixed. A review by the Agency for Healthcare Research and Quality (AHRQ) from 2015 stated that evidence of benefit in the general population was unclear. A review from 2017 found a modest effect on time until onset of sleep. Another review from 2017 put this decrease at six minutes to sleep onset but found no difference in total sleep time.

Melatonin may improve sleep in people with autism. Children with autism have abnormal melatonin pathways and below-average physiological levels of melatonin. Melatonin supplementation has been shown to improve sleep duration, sleep onset latency, and night-time awakenings. However, many studies on melatonin and autism rely on self-reported levels of improvement and more rigorous research is needed. While the packaging of melatonin often warns against use in people under 18 years of age, studies suggest that melatonin is also an efficacious and safe treatment for insomnia in people with ADHD, including children. However, larger and longer studies are needed to establish long-term safety and optimal dosing.

The American Academy of Sleep Medicine's 2017 clinical practice guidelines recommended against the use of melatonin in the treatment of insomnia due to poor effectiveness and very low quality of evidence.

The melatonin receptor agonist medication ramelteon may work as well as melatonin, at greater cost but with different adverse effects, for some sleep conditions.

There is evidence to suggest that the typical advertised dose of most melatonin supplements (more than 1mg) are excessive for the treatment of insomnia and may even be detrimental to overall sleep quality. Controlled-release melatonin at a dose of 4mg has been found to cause excessive melatonin levels upon waking (>50pg/mL), possibly contributing to lethargy in the morning. By contrast, 0.4mg of controlled release melatonin was not found to cause elevated melatonin levels upon waking.

Circadian rhythm sleep disorders
Melatonin may be useful in the treatment of delayed sleep phase syndrome.

Melatonin is known to reduce jet lag, especially in eastward travel. However, if it is not taken at the correct time, it can instead delay adaptation.

Melatonin appears to have limited use against the sleep problems of people who work shift work. Tentative evidence suggests that it increases the length of time people are able to sleep.

REM sleep behavior disorder
Melatonin is a safer alternative than clonazepam in the treatment of REM sleep behavior disorder – a condition associated with the synucleinopathies like Parkinson's disease and dementia with Lewy bodies. However, clonazepam may be more effective. In any case, the quality of evidence for both treatments is very low and it is unclear whether either are definitely effective.

Dementia
A 2020 Cochrane review found no evidence that melatonin helped sleep problems in people with moderate to severe dementia due to Alzheimer's disease. A 2019 review found that while melatonin may improve sleep in minimal cognitive impairment, after the onset of Alzheimer's disease it has little to no effect. Melatonin may, however, help with sundowning (increased confusion and restlessness at night) in people with dementia.

Available forms

A prolonged-release 2mg oral formulation of melatonin sold under the brand name Circadin is approved for use in the European Union in the short-term treatment of insomnia in people age 55 and older.

Melatonin is also available as an over-the-counter dietary supplement in many countries. It is available in both immediate-release and less commonly prolonged-release forms. The compound is available in supplements at doses ranging from 0.3mg to 10mg or more. It is also possible to buy raw melatonin powder by the weight. Immediate-release formulations of melatonin cause blood levels of melatonin to reach their peak in about an hour. The hormone may be administered orally, as capsules, gummies, tablets, or liquids. It is also available for use sublingually, or as transdermal patches.

The American Academy of Sleep Medicine (AASM) said that the melatonin content in unregulated (without a USP verified mark) supplements can diverge widely from the claimed amount; a study found that the melatonin content ranged from one half to four times the stated dose.

Contraindications
Contraindications of melatonin include hypersensitivity reactions among others. It is not recommended in people with autoimmune diseases due to lack of data in these individuals. Prolonged-release pharmaceutical melatonin (Circadin) contains lactose and should not be used in people with the lactase deficiency or glucose–galactose malabsorption. Use of melatonin is also not recommend in women who are pregnant or breastfeeding or in people with liver disease.

Adverse effects
Melatonin appears to cause very few side effects as tested in the short term, up to three months, at low doses. Two systematic reviews found no adverse effects of exogenous melatonin in several clinical trials, and comparative trials found the adverse effects headaches, dizziness, nausea, and drowsiness were reported about equally for both melatonin and placebo. Prolonged-release melatonin is safe with long-term use of up to 12 months. Although not recommended for long-term use beyond this, low-dose melatonin is generally safer, and a better alternative, than many prescription and over-the-counter sleep aids if a sleeping medication must be used for an extended period of time. Low doses of melatonin are usually sufficient to produce a hypnotic effect in most people. Higher doses do not appear to result in a stronger effect but instead appear to cause drowsiness for a longer period of time.

There is emerging evidence that the timing of taking exogenous melatonin in relation to food is also an important factor. Specifically, taking exogenous melatonin shortly after a meal is correlated with impaired glucose tolerance. Therefore, Rubio-Sastre and colleagues recommend waiting at least 2 hours after the last meal before taking a melatonin supplement.

Melatonin can cause nausea, next-day grogginess, and irritability. In autoimmune disorders, evidence is conflicting whether melatonin supplementation may ameliorate or exacerbate symptoms due to immunomodulation.

Melatonin can lower follicle-stimulating hormone levels. Melatonin's effects on human reproduction remain unclear.

Some supplemental melatonin users report an increase in vivid dreaming. Extremely high doses of melatonin increased REM sleep time and dream activity in people both with and without narcolepsy.

In 2022 the American Academy of Sleep Medicine (AASM) advised that parents should talk to a healthcare professional before giving melatonin or any supplement to children. Increased use of melatonin in the 21st century has significantly increased reports of melatonin overdose, calls to poison control centers, and related emergency department visits for children. The number of children who unintentionally ingested melatonin supplements in the US had increased 530% from 2012 to 2021. Over 4,000 reported ingestions required a hospital stay, and 287 children required intensive care. And the AASM says there is little evidence that melatonin supplementation is effective in treating insomnia in healthy children.

Overdose
Melatonin appears to be relatively safe in overdose. It has been administered at daily doses of up to 300mg without causing clinically significant adverse reactions in the literature. The most commonly reported adverse effect of melatonin overdose is somnolence. Upon melatonin overdose, drowsiness may be expected and the compound should be cleared within 12hours. No special treatment is needed for melatonin overdose.

Interactions
Melatonin is metabolized mainly by CYP1A enzymes. As such, inhibitors and inducers of CYP1A enzymes, such as CYP1A2, can modify melatonin metabolism and exposure. As an example, the CYP1A2 and CYP2C19 inhibitor fluvoxamine increases melatonin peak levels by 12-fold and overall exposure by 17-fold and this combination should be avoided. CYP1A2 inducers like cigarette smoking, carbamazepine, and rifampicin may reduce melatonin exposure due to induction of CYP1A2.

In those taking warfarin, some evidence suggests there may exist a potentiating interaction, increasing the anticoagulant effect of warfarin and the risk of bleeding.

Pharmacology

Pharmacodynamics
Melatonin acts as an agonist of the melatonin MT1 and MT2 receptors, the biological targets of endogenous melatonin. Endogenous melatonin is normally secreted from the pineal gland of the brain. Melatonin is thought to activate melatonin receptors in the suprachiasmatic nucleus of the hypothalamus to regulate the circadian clock and sleep–wake cycles. When used several hours before sleep according to the phase response curve for melatonin in humans, small amounts (0.3 mg) of melatonin shift the circadian clock earlier, thus promoting earlier sleep onset and morning awakening.

Pharmacokinetics

Absorption
The bioavailability of melatonin is between 2.5 and 50%. Melatonin is rapidly absorbed and distributed, reaching peak plasma concentrations after 60minutes of administration, and is then eliminated. Usual doses of exogenous melatonin of 1 to 12mg produce melatonin concentrations 10 to 100times higher than endogenous peak levels.

Distribution
The plasma protein binding of melatonin is approximately 60%. It is mainly bound to albumin, α1-acid glycoprotein, and high-density lipoprotein.

The membrane transport proteins that move melatonin across a membrane include, but are not limited to, glucose transporters, including GLUT1, and the proton-driven oligopeptide transporters PEPT1 and PEPT2.

Metabolism
Melatonin is metabolized in the liver by cytochrome P450 enzyme CYP1A2 to 6-hydroxymelatonin. Metabolites are conjugated with sulfuric acid or glucuronic acid for excretion in the urine. Some of the metabolites formed via the reaction of melatonin with a free radical include cyclic 3-hydroxymelatonin, N1-acetyl-N2-formyl-5-methoxykynuramine (AFMK), and N1-acetyl-5-methoxykynuramine (AMK).

Elimination
In humans, 90% of orally administered exogenous melatonin is cleared in a single passage through the liver, a small amount is excreted in urine, and a small amount is found in saliva. Melatonin is excreted in the urine 2 to 5% as the unchanged drug.

Melatonin has an elimination half-life of about 20 to 60 minutes. The half-life of prolonged-release melatonin (Circadin) is 3.5 to 4hours.

Chemistry
Melatonin, also known as N-acetyl-5-methoxytryptamine, is a substituted tryptamine and a derivative of serotonin (5-hydroxytryptamine). It is structurally related to N-acetylserotonin (normelatonin; N-acetyl-5-hydroxytryptamine), which is the chemical intermediate between serotonin and melatonin in the body. Synthetic melatonin receptor agonists used in medicine like ramelteon, tasimelteon, agomelatine, and piromelatine (still in clinical trials) are analogues of melatonin.

History
The first patent for its use in circadian rhythm disorders was granted in 1987 to Roger V Short and Stuart Armstrong at Monash University, and the first patent for its use as a low-dose sleep aid was granted to Richard Wurtman at MIT in 1995. Around the same time, the hormone got a lot of press as a possible treatment for many illnesses. The New England Journal of Medicine editorialized in 2000: "With these recent careful and precise observations in blind persons, the true potential of melatonin is becoming evident, and the importance of the timing of treatment is becoming clear."

It was approved for medical use in the European Union in 2007.

Society and culture

Melatonin is categorized by the US Food and Drug Administration (FDA) as a dietary supplement, and is sold over-the-counter in both the US and Canada. FDA regulations applying to medications are not applicable to melatonin, though the FDA has found false claims that it cures cancer. As melatonin may cause harm in combination with certain medications or in the case of certain disorders, a doctor or pharmacist should be consulted before making a decision to take melatonin. In many countries, melatonin is recognized as a neurohormone and it cannot be sold over-the-counter. According to Harriet Hall caution is advisable, since quality control is a documented problem. 71% of products did not contain within 10% of the labelled amount of melatonin, with variations ranging from -83% to +478%, lot-to-lot variability was as high as 465%, and the discrepancies were not correlated to any manufacturer or product type. To make matters worse, 8 out of 31 products were contaminated with the neurotransmitter serotonin.

Formerly, melatonin was derived from animal pineal tissue, such as bovine. It is now synthetic, which limits the risk of contamination or the means of transmitting infectious material.

Melatonin is the most popular over-the-counter sleep remedy in the United States, resulting in sales in excess of US$400 million during 2017. In 2020, it was the 298th most commonly prescribed medication in the US, with more than 1million prescriptions.

Beverages and snacks containing melatonin were being sold in grocery stores, convenience stores, and clubs in May 2011. The FDA considered whether these food products could continue to be sold with the label "dietary supplements". On 13 January 2010, it issued a Warning Letter to Innovative Beverage, creators of several beverages marketed as drinks, stating that melatonin, while legal as a dietary supplement, was not approved as a food additive. Bebida Beverage Company received a warning letter in 2015 for selling a melatonin-containing beverage.

Research

Psychiatry

Depression
Some research supports an antidepressant effect of melatonin.

Bipolar disorder
Melatonin, along with ramelteon, has been repurposed as a possible adjunctive treatment for manic episodes in bipolar disorder. However, meta-analytic evidence is somehow inconsistent and of limited interest so far, although the small samples of trials do not allow ruling out its beneficial effect. In any case, current evidence does not support the use of add-on melatonin-receptor agonists for mania.

Anxiety
Melatonin in comparison to placebo is effective for reducing preoperative anxiety in adults when given as premedication. It may be just as effective as standard treatment with benzodiazepine in reducing preoperative anxiety. Melatonin may also reduce postoperative anxiety (measured 6 hours after surgery) when compared to placebo.

Headaches
Tentative evidence shows melatonin may help reduce some types of headaches including cluster and hypnic headaches.

Cancer
A 2013 review by the National Cancer Institute found insufficient evidence for melatonin having anti-cancer effects. A 2022 review found that melatonin supplementation had a small improvement in survival of people with cancer at one year. One review found that melatonin may alleviate chemotherapy-related side effects.

Protection from radiation
Both animal and human studies have shown melatonin to protect against radiation-induced cellular damage. Melatonin and its metabolites protect organisms from oxidative stress by scavenging reactive oxygen species which are generated during exposure. Nearly 70% of biological damage caused by ionizing radiation is estimated to be attributable to the creation of free radicals, especially the hydroxyl radical that attacks DNA, proteins, and cellular membranes. Melatonin has been described as a broadly protective, readily available, and orally self-administered antioxidant that is without known, major side effects.

Epilepsy
A 2016 review found no beneficial role of melatonin in reducing seizure frequency or improving quality of life in people with epilepsy.

Dysmenorrhea
A 2016 review suggested no strong evidence of melatonin compared to placebo for dysmenorrhea secondary to endometriosis.

Delirium
A 2016 review suggested no clear evidence of melatonin to reduce the incidence of delirium.

Gastroesophageal reflux disease
A 2011 review said melatonin is effective in relieving epigastric pain and heartburn.

Tinnitus
A 2015 review of studies of melatonin in tinnitus found the quality of evidence low, but not entirely without promise.

References

External links
 

 
Acetamides
Antidepressants
Antioxidants
Aromatase inhibitors
Circadian rhythm
Drugs acting on the nervous system
Melatonin receptor agonists
Methoxy compounds
Mexamines
Orphan drugs
Treatment of bipolar disorder
Tryptamine alkaloids
Wikipedia medicine articles ready to translate